James Hemings (17651801) was the first American to train as a chef in France. He was Mulatto and born into slavery in Virginia in 1765. At eight years old, he was enslaved by Thomas Jefferson at his residence of Monticello.

He was an older brother of Sally Hemings and a half-sibling of Jefferson's wife Martha Jefferson. Martha, Sally, and James all shared John Wayles as father. It was said that Wayles had taken James's mother, who was his helper, as his mistress. Being his slave, she could not consent to such a relationship, and thus the term mistress may be misleading. As a young man, Hemings was selected by Jefferson to accompany him to Paris when the latter was appointed Minister to France. There, Hemings was trained to be a French chef; independently, he took lessons to learn how to speak the French language. Hemings is credited with bringing many French cooking styles to colonial America, and developing new recipes inspired by French cuisine. This includes crème brulée and meringues, but most famously, Hemings is credited with the introduction of macaroni and cheese to America.

He returned to the United States with Jefferson, likely because of kinship ties with his large Hemings family at Monticello. Jefferson continued to pay Hemings wages as his chef when he worked for Jefferson in Philadelphia.  Hemings negotiated with Jefferson for his freedom, which he gained in 1796, after training his brother Peter for three years to replace him as chef. Said to suffer from alcoholism, Hemings died by suicide at age 36.

Biography

Early life
James Hemings was born into slavery to Betty Hemings, who was the mixed-race daughter of an enslaved African mother, and  an English sea captain father whose surname was Hemings. James was the second of her six children by her enslaver John Wayles, who took Betty as a forced concubine after he was widowed for the third time.  This situation lasted for 12 years, until his death, and he had six children with her.  They were three-quarters European by ancestry. Betty had four older children by another man. Wayles died in 1773, leaving Betty and the 10 children to his daughter Martha Jefferson, half-sister to his children by Betty. Martha was then married to Thomas Jefferson, who became their enslaver by marriage.

In 1784 Thomas Jefferson took James Hemings with him when he went to Paris as Minister Plenipotentiary to the Court of Versailles, as he wanted the young man, then 19, trained as a chef. While they were in France, Jefferson paid Hemings a wage of four dollars per month, and though it was a steady wage, it was less than Jefferson had paid his previous chef, who was white. For the first three years, Hemings studied cooking and apprenticed to pastry chefs and other specialists, including the chef of a prince.  He paid personally to learn the language from a French tutor.  He earned the role of chef de cuisine in Jefferson's kitchen on the Champs-Élysées. He served his creations to the European aristocrats, writers and scientists whom Jefferson invited to dinner.

Career
It was during his time in France that Hemings learned the French dish of pasta and cheese. He prepared a dish called "macaroni pie". This dish evolved to what Americans call macaroni and cheese today. James is believed to be one of the first American chefs to prepare the original French dish in this way. However, credit is often incorrectly attributed to Thomas Jefferson's cousin, Mary Randolph, as it was later included in her seminal housekeeping book, The Virginia House-Wife. Another dish James introduced to American cuisine is Snow Eggs, which is originally French and consists of meringue and custard.

In Paris, Jefferson became concerned that Hemings might learn that he could be free when France had abolished slavery in 1789.  Using his personal wage, Hemings paid for a French tutor to teach him the language. Though France had abolished slavery at this point, and Hemings wages could have afforded him a lawyer there is no current evidence that shows Hemings attempted to pursue that option. Jefferson wrote about this issue to another American enslaver in a similar situation. According to the 1873 memoir of Madison Hemings, his uncle James and (future) mother Sally actively considered staying in France for freedom while they were in Paris. (Sally Hemings had accompanied one of Jefferson's daughters to France and worked for the family until they returned to the United States.) While fearful of their seeking freedom, Jefferson, who was in debt for most of his life, was also concerned about having paid for training James.

In 1789, however, both the Hemingses returned to America with Jefferson; he continued to pay James wages to work as his chef. They first returned to Monticello.  They lived briefly in a leased house on Maiden Lane in New York City (when the national government was based there), where James Hemings ran the kitchen. 

Hemings was also the chef for one of early America's most famous dinners - one that then-Secretary of State Thomas Jefferson dubbed a meal "to save the union." On June 20, 1790, at a dinner cheffed by Hemings, Alexander Hamilton and Jefferson reconciled after being well-known political enemies. Further, "Alexander Hamilton agreed to establishing Washington, D.C. as the permanent capital; in exchange, James Madison agreed to the federal government assuming the debt of the states."

In the spring of 1791, when James Hemings and Jefferson were resident in Philadelphia, then the capital, the young enslaved man accompanied Jefferson and James Madison on a month-long vacation in the Northeast.  The party traveled through New York and Vermont, stopping at Albany, Lake George, Lake Champlain and Bennington. Jefferson often entrusted Hemings to travel alone ahead of the others to arrange accommodations along the way. After returning south through western Massachusetts and Connecticut, Jefferson and Hemings returned for a long-term stay in Philadelphia.

As Pennsylvania did not allow slavery, Jefferson paid Hemings a wage while he worked there. After two years in Philadelphia, Jefferson made plans to return to Virginia.  Reluctant to return to a slave state, Hemings negotiated a contract with Jefferson by which he would gain freedom after training a replacement chef at Monticello to take his place.

In the 1793 agreement, Jefferson wrote:

Having been at great expence in having James Hemings taught the art of cookery, desiring to befriend him, and to require from him as little in return as possible, I hereby do promise & declare, that if the said James should go with me to Monticello in the course of the ensuing winter, when I go to reside there myself, and shall there continue until he shall have taught such person as I shall place under him for that purpose to be a good cook, this previous condition being performed, he shall thereupon be made free ...

Considering that Hemings had served Jefferson well for years, some historians have described this as a grudging manumission.

For two years, Hemings trained his younger brother Peter, also enslaved from birth, as chef at Monticello, and finally gained his freedom in 1796. He spoke French and English and was literate; his handwritten inventory of kitchen supplies made before he left Monticello is held by the Library of Congress. He also left recipes and other writings. After traveling to Europe, Hemings eventually returned to the United States, where he found work as a cook in Philadelphia.

Little is known about Hemings' personal life. He never married, nor did he have children. One of the difficulties in imagining his life outside of Thomas Jefferson, is that there is a scarcity of authenticated and preserved sources that are directly traceable to him. One of the only sources that is directly traceable to James, is a handwritten list of kitchen utensils. According to culinary historian Michael Twitty, it is possible that Hemings had a "somewhat fluid sexuality".

In 1801, Jefferson offered Hemings a position at the White House, which Hemings declined, as he felt he could not immediately leave his position in Baltimore. When Jefferson inquired a second time, Hemings responded through an intermediary, Francis Sayes, who had worked with Hemings when they were in New York and in Philadelphia. Sayes reported, "I have spoke to James according to your Desire he has made mention again as he did before that he was willing to serve you before any other man in the Union but sence he understands that he would have to be among strange servants he would be very much obliged to you if you would send him a few lines of engagement and on what conditions and what wages you would please to give him with your own hand wreiting." Jefferson did not write Hemings, reasoning that he did not want to "urge him against inclination." Hemings later returned briefly to Monticello, working for a month and a half in the kitchen and earning thirty dollars before leaving. Later, while employed as a cook in a tavern in Baltimore, he died by suicide, at age 36.

Jefferson's friend William Evans in Baltimore made inquiries, and on November 5, 1801, he wrote: The report respecting James Hemings having committed an act of suicide is true. I made every inquiry at the time this melancholy circumstance took place. The result of which was, that he had been delirious for some days prior to committing the act, and it was the general opinion that drinking too freely was the cause.

On November 9, 1801, Jefferson wrote from Washington, DC, to James Dinsmore, the Irish joiner managing much of the construction at Monticello, recounting the circumstances of Hemings' death, presumably with instructions to tell his mother Betty and his brother John, who was Dinsmore's assistant. On December 4, 1801, Jefferson wrote to his son-in-law, Thomas Mann Randolph, characterizing Hemings' death as a "tragical end."

Further reading
Annette Gordon-Reed, The Hemingses of Monticello: An American Family, New York: W.W. Norton and Co., 2008, winner of the 2009 Pulitzer Prize for History and 15 other history/literary awards
Lucia Stanton, Free Some Day: The African-American Families of Monticello, Charlottesville: Thomas Jefferson Foundation, 2000.
Thomas J. Craughwell, Thomas Jefferson's Creme Brûlée: How a Founding Father and His Slave James Hemings Introduced French Cuisine to America, Philadelphia: Quirk Books, 2012, 233 pages; .
Charles A. Cerami, Dinner at Mr. Jefferson's: Three Men, Five Great Wines, and the Evening that Changed America, Hoboken: John Wiley & Sons, 2008, 270 pages; .

References

External links
Thomas Jefferson – James Hemings Deed of Manumission
François Furstenberg, "Jefferson's Other Family: His concubine was also his wife's half-sister", review of Annette Gordon-Reed, The Hemingses of Monticello, Slate, September 23, 2008

1765 births
1801 deaths
18th-century African-American people
American chefs
American male chefs
18th-century American slaves
Hemings family
People from Charles City County, Virginia
Suicides by firearm in Maryland
Virginia colonial people
Presidents of the United States and slavery
1800s suicides
American people of English descent